Rouzi Maimaiti (born 4 July 1983) is a Chinese professional snooker player.

Career
Maimaiti has been a wildcard player at several ranking tournaments before turning professional. He lost the majority of the matches except a 5–1 over Dave Harold in the 2012 Wuxi Classic, before suffering a reverse to Mark Allen in the last 32 stage. Also in the 2012–13 season, Maimaiti entered into the new Asian Players Tour Championship events with little success, winning only one match The 2013/2014 events were much more successful and with eight wins in the four events Maimaiti was able to qualify for one of the four professional World Snooker Tour cards available through the Asian Tour of Merit money list. Maimaiti qualified for the 2014–15 and 2015–16 seasons and then re-qualified for the 2016–17 and 2017–18 seasons.

Professional
Rouzi only played in the three Asian Tour events during the 2014–15 season. He won four matches to reach the quarter-finals of the Xuzhou Open, where he lost 4–1 to Joe Perry which saw him finish 25th on the Order of Merit. The following season he only played in the Haining Open, losing 4–1 to Tom Ford in the second round. Despite dropping off the tour having finished a lowly 115th in the world, he received the Chinese nomination for a new two-year tour place. He did not enter a single event in the 2016–17 season.

Performance and rankings timeline

References

External links
Rouzi Maimaiti at worldsnooker.com

1983 births
Place of birth missing (living people)
Living people
Chinese snooker players
Uyghur sportspeople
Chinese people of Uyghur descent
21st-century Chinese people